Newton Canegal (4 June 1917 – 23 March 2003), was a Brazilian professional footballer who played as a defender.

Club career 
Newton Canegal began his football career with Portuguesa of Rio de Janeiro in 1936 and played there until 1938. In 1938 he switched to local rival Bonsucesso, with which he played for a year.

In 1939 he moved to Flamengo, where he played until the end of his career until 1952. With Flamengo he won the Rio de Janeiro championship four times - 1939, 1942, 1943 and 1944.

International career 
For the Brazil national team, Canegal played in the 1945 and 1946 Copa America (runner-up in both). In 1945 he won the Copa Roca (now called Superderby the Americas) with Brazil.

In the Brazil national team, Newton Canegal made his debut for the Brazil national team on 14 February 1945 against Argentina in the 1945 Copa América, which Brazil finished runners-up. At this tournament, Newton appeared in two matches - against Argentina and Ecuador. In the same year he won the Copa Roca against Argentina.

In 1946 he participated for the second time in the Copa América tournament, where Brazil finished second, again. He last appeared for the national team on 4 April 1948 in a match against the Uruguay national team. In total, from years 1945–1948 Newton appeared in seven matches for Brazil.

Death
Newton Canegal suffered from Parkinson's disease and died of heart failure on 23 March 2003 at the age of 85.

Titles
 Flamengo
 Campeonato Carioca: 1939, 1942, 1943, 1944

Other achievements
Flamengo
Torneio Relâmpago do Rio de Janeiro: 1943
Torneio Início do Rio de Janeiro: 1946, 1951 e 1952
Troféu Cezar Aboud: 1948
Troféu Embaixada Brasileira da Guatemala: 1949
Troféu Comitê Olímpico Nacional da Guatemala: 1949
Taça Cidade de Ilhéus: 1950
Copa Elfsborg: 1951
Torneio Internacional de Lima: 1952
Troféu Cidade de Arequipa: 1952

Brazil
Roca Cup: 1945

See also 
 List of Clube de Regatas do Flamengo players

References

External links 
 Newton Canegal at playmakerstats.com (English version of ogol.com.br)

2003 deaths
Footballers from Rio de Janeiro (city)
Brazilian footballers
Association football defenders
CR Flamengo footballers
Campeonato Brasileiro Série A players
1917 births
Brazil international footballers